was a Japanese citizen who was kidnapped and later beheaded in Iraq on 29 October 2004, by Abu Musab al-Zarqawi's group, while touring the country. He was the first Japanese person beheaded in Iraq.

Early life and education
Koda's parents, Setsuko Koda and Masumi Koda, were members of the United Church of Christ. Due to Koda's family affiliation with the United Church of Christ, a cross tattoo was inscribed upon his arm. The family was from Nōgata, Fukuoka, a small southern city in Japan, and his mother was a nurse. Koda dropped out of high school in his junior year before he started working as an interior painter until 2002.

Kidnapping and death
Koda left Amman on 20 October 2004. He ignored advice not to travel to Iraq, and entered the country, because he was curious as to what happened there.

Koda's captors stated that they would "treat him like his predecessors Berg and Bigley" (Bigley was murdered just weeks before by the organization, before being known as Al Qaeda in Iraq) if Japan did not withdraw its forces from Iraq within 48 hours. The Japanese government headed by Prime Minister Junichiro Koizumi refused to comply with these demands, stating that they will not concede to terrorists.

In the video sequence of Koda's murder, Koda sits on the American flag, his captors standing behind him. Koda's hands are tied behind his back. He is blindfolded while a captor reads a speech for two minutes and ten seconds. The captors then hold him down on the ground as they begin to decapitate him. Throughout the beheading, "Erhaby Ana", a nasheed, is played. The video sequence ends with shots of Koda's severed head on top of his body followed by shots of the banner of al-Qaeda in Iraq. His body was found in Baghdad on 30 October wrapped in an American flag.

Aftermath
Koda's body was returned to Japan. He was given a Christian funeral. The events provoked mixed responses in Japan; while many Japanese citizens were angered and appalled by the murder, some blamed the victim and others criticized the Koizumi administration.

Koda's given name, Shōsei, literally means "proof of life" in Japanese. Mark Simkin of the Australian television news program Lateline said that this was an "awful irony" for people who had prayed for Koda's survival for four days.

See also 

 Kenji Goto
 Piotr Stańczak
 Eugene Armstrong
 Paul Marshall Johnson Jr.
 Kim Sun-il
 Jack Hensley
 Daniel Pearl
 Margaret Hassan
 Seif Adnan Kanaan

References

External links 
 Shosei Koda's Grave

1979 births
2004 deaths
2004 murders in Iraq
People from Nōgata, Fukuoka
Deaths by decapitation
Foreign hostages in Iraq
Japanese people murdered abroad
Japanese people of the Iraq War
Japanese people taken hostage
Japanese terrorism victims
People murdered in Iraq
Terrorism deaths in Iraq
Islamism-related beheadings
Iraq–Japan relations
Missing person cases in Iraq
Filmed executions in Iraq
Beheading videos